Breynton is an English surname. Famous people with this surname are:

 Rev Dr John Breynton, DD (1719-1799) - rector of St Paul's Church, Halifax, Nova Scotia during the 18th century

Other 
 Gypsy Breynton, fiction series of books by author Elizabeth Stuart Phelps Ward

Variants include:
 Brinton (disambiguation)

Surnames